Mahmudabad-e Yek may refer to:
 Mahmudabad-e Yek, Kuh Panj
 Mahmudabad-e Yek, Negar